The Supercopa de España de Baloncesto 2014 is the 11th edition of the tournament, since it is organized by the ACB. It is also called Supercopa Endesa for sponsorship reasons.

It was played in the Fernando Buesa Arena in Vitoria-Gasteiz on September 26 and 27.

Participant teams
On 20 May 2014, the ACB announced the three first participants. The fourth participant was announced on 16 June 2014, after FC Barcelona qualified for the 2013–14 ACB Finals.

Semifinals
The draw of the semifinals was on September 10, 2014, and it was held in the Palacio Escoriaza-Esquivel, Vitoria-Gasteiz.

Final

References

External links
 Liga ACB website

Supercopa de España de Baloncesto
2014–15 in Spanish basketball cups